Barbezieux-Saint-Hilaire is a commune in the Charente department, Southwestern France. The commune was formed in 1973 by the merger of the former communes Barbezieux and Saint-Hilaire. With 4,714 inhabitants (2019), it forms the most important town in Southern Charente.

Barbezieux is a fortified hill town on the historic route south west from Paris – Poitiers to Bordeaux – Spain, now served by the N 10, which bypasses Barbezieux. The town rises from narrow streets of unspoilt, typically Charentaise buildings to the medieval chateau, which dominates the western approach. Barbezieux-Saint-Hilarie is the birthplace of world-record breaker pole vaulter Renaud Lavillenie and his brother, fellow vaulter Valentin Lavillenie.

Population

Wine
Barbezieux also forms part of the Petite Champagne area of cognac wine growing, second only to the finest Grande Champagne and is in the heart of the vineyards producing cognac and the local drink Pineau de Charente.

Services
The access to the N10 means that Barbezieux has developed as a modern lively town of over 5000 inhabitants, whilst retaining all the character of the old town, with interesting shops; twice weekly markets; foires and other public entertainments; lido; cinema; sporting and equestrian facilities, also a high school, a hospital, and other important services for the whole area.

Tourism
Barbezieux is a centre for touring the South Charente and also a short drive from the coast. For tourists and cyclists following the Chemin de St Jacques to Compostella, the Voie Verte, or Green Way, is the former railway line, running approx 40 km. South from Barbezieux towards Bordeaux. There is accommodation for those wishing to visit the town including a Chambres D'Hôtes in the restored 18th century Maison de Maitre, hosting a fine collection of Modern Art, to be found in Rue de L'Alma in the heart of the old town.

St Mathias Church

The main church of Barbezieux, St Mathias, was built in the twelfth century and is one of the largest in the Diocese of Angoulême. Entering the church, there is the statue of St Mathias. At one time, the Apostle's head is said to have been kept in the church. The church has been altered over the centuries and had major restoration in the 1970s. It is a fine example of a Romanesque church, well used by the community.

Notable people
 Corine Pelluchon (born 1967), philosopher and professor

See also
Communes of the Charente department

References

Communes of Charente
County of Saintonge